Pavit Tangkamolprasert (born 2 May 1989) is a Thai professional golfer who plays on the Asian Tour where he has won twice. His first win on the tour came in 2016 when he won the Venetian Macao Open after a playoff against Anirban Lahiri. In 2019 he won the Sabah Masters in a four-man playoff, chipping in at the second playoff hole. Two weeks before this he had lost in a playoff for the Thailand Open. In 2014 he won the Asian Development Tour Order of Merit with three wins during the season.

Professional wins (12)

Asian Tour wins (2)

Asian Tour playoff record (2–1)

Asian Development Tour wins (7)

1Co-sanctioned by the Professional Golf of Malaysia Tour
2Co-sanctioned by the Taiwan PGA Tour
3Co-sanctioned by the All Thailand Golf Tour

All Thailand Golf Tour wins (3)

1Co-sanctioned by the Asian Development Tour

ASEAN PGA Tour wins (1)

Thailand PGA Tour wins (1)

References

External links

Pavit Tangkamolprasert
Asian Tour golfers
1989 births
Living people